The 2015–16 Lithuanian Football Cup was the twenty-seventh season of the Lithuanian annual football knock-out tournament. The competition started on 2 June 2015 with the matches of the first round and ended in May 2016. Žalgiris are the defending champions.

The winners will qualify for the first qualifying round of the 2016–17 UEFA Europa League.

First round 
The matches started on 2 June 2015 and ended on 26 June 2015.

!colspan="3" align="center"|2 June

|-
!colspan="3" align="center"|9 June

|-
!colspan="3" align="center"|11 June

|-
!colspan="3" align="center"|12 June

|-
!colspan="3" align="center"|13 June

|-
!colspan="3" align="center"|14 June

|-
!colspan="3" align="center"|16 June

|-
!colspan="3" align="center"|21 June

|-
!colspan="3" align="center"|26 June

|}

Second round 

!colspan="3" align="center"|11 July 2015

|-
!colspan="3" align="center"|12 July 2015

|-
!colspan="3" align="center"|17 July 2015

|-
!colspan="3" align="center"|22 July 2015

|-
!colspan="3" align="center"|23 July 2015

|-
!colspan="3" align="center"|24 July 2015

|-
!colspan="3" align="center"|25 July 2015

|-
!colspan="3" align="center"|30 July 2015

|-
!colspan="3" align="center"|3 August 2015

|-
!colspan="3" align="center"|5 August 2015

|}

Third round 

!colspan="3" align="center"|23 August 2015
|-

|-
!colspan="3" align="center"|25 August 2015

|-
!colspan="3" align="center"|2 September 2015

|-
!colspan="3" align="center"|3 September 2015

|-
!colspan="3" align="center"|5 September 2015

|}

Fourth round 

!colspan="3" align="center"|22 September 2015
|-

|}

Round of 16 

!colspan="3" align="center"|29 September 2015
|-

|-
!colspan="3" align="center"|30 September 2015

|}

Quarter-finals  

|}

Semi-finals 

|}

Final 
The final took place on 15 May 2016, in the new stadium that has been built in Telšiai.

|}

References

External links

Cup
Cup
2015–16 European domestic association football cups
2015-16